Mount Wrather is a rock peak (2,095 m) 2.5 nautical miles (4.6 km) south-southeast of Mount Walcott along the east margin of the Thiel Mountains. The name was proposed by Peter Bermel and Arthur Ford, co-leaders of the United States Geological Survey (USGS) Thiel Mountains party that surveyed the mountains in 1960–61. It was named for William E. Wrather, the sixth director of the U.S. Geological Survey from 1943 to 1956.

Mountains of Ellsworth Land